Starigrad is a municipality in Croatia in the Zadar County. The total population is 1,876 (census 2011). According to the 2011 census, 96% of the population are Croats.

The list of settlements in the municipality is:
 Seline, population 469
 Starigrad Paklenica, population 1,140
 Tribanj, population 267

History

Emperor Tiberius erected protective walls and towers. Findings from about four hundred tombs are an evidence of great prosperity and trade relations in the Mediterranean. The oldest relic in the vicinity of Starigrad is the St. George Chapel in Rovanjska and St. Peter's Chapel in Starigrad from the ninth or tenth century. Mediaeval traces are the castles "Večka kula" (old names were: Vega, Vegium (not to be confused with Vegium (Karlobag).) and Wezuliae), which was the mediaeval Harbormasters' office, on a peninsula east of Starigrad and the "Paklarić" on the prehistoric ruins of the entrance to the Velika Paklenica.

References

Municipalities of Croatia
Populated coastal places in Croatia
Populated places in Zadar County
Illyrian Croatia